Qamashi is a city in Qamashi District of Qashqadaryo Region in Uzbekistan. It is the capital of Qamashi District.
The length of transport road from Kamashi to Karshi is 63 km . According to local information, the name Q is derived from the name of the kamaychi branch of the Uzbek Kungirot clan.The population of this city  is 34 thousand people (2005). In Qamashi there is a cotton gin, a building materials factory , and other construction organizations, MTP, Qamashi car dealership company, computer clubs, a dog park, amusement parks, high-rise residences, a chain of hardware and food stores, "Langar Ota" shrine, "Mikron" company (making pasta), a leather processing enterprise, and a wool factory. In addition, small, medium and large enterprises, micro-firms have been working for many years. There are 2 lyceums, 32 vocational colleges, 5 general education schools, children's music and sports schools, a central library, club institutions, and a cultural center this city. The district central hospital, polyclinic, maternity hospital, pharmacies and medical institutions serve the population. There are buses and route taxis from Qamashi to the regional center (Karshi city)

Population 
The town population was 22,270 people in 1989, 34,000 in 2005, and 39,100 in 2016.

References

Populated places in Qashqadaryo Region
Cities in Uzbekistan